Andreas Steiner (born 31 March 1964) is an Austrian athlete. He competed in the men's long jump at the 1988 Summer Olympics.

References

1964 births
Living people
Athletes (track and field) at the 1988 Summer Olympics
Austrian male long jumpers
Olympic athletes of Austria
Place of birth missing (living people)